Laura Freigang (born 1 February 1998) is a German footballer who plays as a forward for Eintracht Frankfurt and the Germany national team.

Career
Freigang made her international debut for Germany on 7 March 2020 in the 2020 Algarve Cup against Norway, which finished as a 4–0 win.

Career statistics

Scores and results list Germany's goal tally first, score column indicates score after each Freigang goal.

Honours 
Germany

 UEFA Women's Championship runner-up: 2022

References

External links
 
 
 
 

1998 births
Living people
Sportspeople from Kiel
Footballers from Schleswig-Holstein
German women's footballers
Women's association football forwards
Germany women's international footballers
Germany women's youth international footballers
UEFA Women's Euro 2022 players
Frauen-Bundesliga players
2. Frauen-Bundesliga players
Penn State Nittany Lions women's soccer players
1. FFC Frankfurt players
Eintracht Frankfurt (women) players
German expatriate footballers
German expatriate sportspeople in the United States
Expatriate women's soccer players in the United States